William Alexander Tolmie (1833 – 8 August 1875) was a 19th-century Member of Parliament from Dunedin, New Zealand.

References

1833 births
1875 deaths
Members of the New Zealand House of Representatives
New Zealand MPs for Dunedin electorates
Burials at Dunedin Northern Cemetery
19th-century New Zealand politicians
Scottish emigrants to New Zealand